This is a list of science fiction and fantasy awards for literature.

A
Aelita Prize
Andre Norton Award
Arthur C. Clarke Award
Aurealis Award
August Derleth Award
Author Emeritus

B
Balrog Award
Bradbury Award
Bram Stoker Award
British Fantasy Award
BSFA Award

C
Chesley Awards
Compton Crook Award
Crawford Award
CYGNUS Award

D
Damon Knight Memorial Grand Master Award
Darrell Awards
Ditmar Award
Double Gammas
The Dragon Awards
Dwarf Stars Award

E
Endeavour Award
Eugie Award

F
First Fandom Hall of Fame Award

G
Gandalf Award
Gaylactic Spectrum Awards
Geffen Award
Golden Duck Award

H
Hugo Award

I
International Fantasy Award
Isaac Asimov Awards

J
James Tiptree, Jr. Award
James White Award
Japan Fantasy Novel Award
John W. Campbell Award for Best New Writer
John W. Campbell Memorial Award for Best Science Fiction Novel
Jupiter Award

K
Kurd-Laßwitz-Preis

L
Lewis Carroll Shelf Award
Locus Award

M
Mythopoeic Awards

N
Nebula Award

P
Philip K. Dick Award
Pilgrim Award
Premio Omelas
Prix Aurora Awards
Prix Tour-Apollo Award
Prometheus Award

R
Robert A. Heinlein Award
Rhysling Award

S
Saturn Award
Science Fiction & Fantasy Translation Awards
Scribe Award
Seiun Award
Sense of Gender Awards
Shirley Jackson Award
Sidewise Award for Alternate History
Sir Julius Vogel Award
Sunburst Award

T
Tähtifantasia Award
Tähtivaeltaja Award
Theodore Sturgeon Award

W
World Fantasy Award
Writers of the Future
WSFA Small Press Award

References

 Science Fiction
 
Awards
Awards